Maroon Friends 1946 is an FK Sarajevo fan association and advocacy group organized by influential individuals from the financial, political, and cultural sectors of Bosnian society with the aim of lobbying both locally and internationally for the club and influencing club policies. The association has strong informal ties to FK Sarajevo Ultras, Horde Zla.

History
In 2009, a handful of eminent supporters of FK Sarajevo, including fashion designer Adnan Hajrulahović, poet and musician Benjamin Isović, entrepreneur Avdo Salihbegović and others started having informal meetings about the possibility of organizing a new supporter's association with the goal of helping the club. These meetings led to the formal registration of an Association of Citizens in 2010, which quickly struck a strong partnership with the club's Ultras group, Horde zla. After a thorough analysis of club finances and the announced shift in UEFA licensing, the association came to the conclusion that the club would be in a dire situation by 2012. After the founding Assembly, a platform and organizational plan were forged under the working title Projekt 2010-2014. The association wrote a new template for the club's statute and found bureaucratic loopholes in Bosnia's law in order to potentially attract foreign investment seeing the country has no Sports Law. FK Sarajevo's management at the time, witnessing the association's polyvalence, quickly invited members to join the club's assembly and board, which they did. On 14 July 2012, the new club statute was voted into power, enabling Malaysian businessman, investor and Chairman of Berjaya Group, Vincent Tan, who had earlier been lobbied by Scotiabank director and association member Feđa Kusturica, to buy majority stocks and become de facto owner of the club.

Media
Maroon Friends 1946 has been publishing a monthly magazine named Maroon Fan since 2010. Furthermore, it has, in cooperation with Moja TV, an IPTV provider and subsidiary of the BH Telecom, founded an internet-based television channel named Bordo TV.

Bodies

Presidency
As of 29 July 2016

Assembly
As of 29 July 2016

Gallery

References

External links

   
 

FK Sarajevo
Association football supporters' associations
Association football culture